Uruguay sent a team of 12 athletes to compete in the 2008 Summer Olympics held in Beijing, People's Republic of China from August 8 to August 24, 2008.

Athletics

Men

Women

Cycling

Track
Points Race

Rowing

Men

Qualification Legend: FA=Final A (medal); FB=Final B (non-medal); FC=Final C (non-medal); FD=Final D (non-medal); FE=Final E (non-medal); FF=Final F (non-medal); SA/B=Semifinals A/B; SC/D=Semifinals C/D; SE/F=Semifinals E/F; QF=Quarterfinals; R=Repechage

Sailing

Men

M = Medal race; EL = Eliminated – did not advance into the medal race; CAN = Race cancelled;

Shooting

Women

Swimming

Men

Women

See also
 Uruguay at the 2008 Summer Paralympics
 Uruguay at the 2007 Pan American Games

References

Nations at the 2008 Summer Olympics
2008
Olympics